London Capital Credit Union Limited is a not-for-profit member-owned financial co-operative, based in Archway and operating in the City of London and north London boroughs of Barnet, Camden, Hackney, Haringey and Islington.
	
Founded in 1997, by 2014, the credit union had over 11,000 members and assets in excess of £7m. A small permanent staff are supported by a team of volunteer Member Services Assistants.

History

Islington Council Employees Credit Union was originally established in 1997, to provide secure savings and low cost flexible loans for employees of Islington Council. It became Islington and City Credit Union in 2007, briefly Haringey, Islington and City Credit Union (with the support of Haringey Council) in 2011 and finally adopted the current name, broadening its catchment to include Barnet, Camden and Hackney, in 2012.

Hornsey Co-operative Credit Union, one of Britain's first registered credit unions, and North West London Credit Union transferred engagements to London Capital in 2013, followed by the smaller Radio Taxicabs Credit Union in 2014.

David Lammy, Labour member of Parliament for Tottenham, was signed into membership in 2014, followed by Dave Prentis, General Secretary of the public service trade union, UNISON (then President of Unity Trust Bank and a non-executive director of the Bank of England). UNISON's registered charity, There for You, has been working in partnership with the credit union since 2013.

In 2015, a merger with the small Rainbow Credit Union for Co-operative members and employees in London and the South East proved impractical; it was placed into administration and ceased trading on 14 September.

Activities
The credit union promotes thrift by the accumulation of savings, creating sources of credit at a fair and reasonable rate of interest by using savings for the mutual benefit. Its objects include the training and education of members in the wise use of money and in the management of their financial affairs.

Credit unions form part of the wider international co-operative movement and can be found in 97 countries, with over 184 million members. In the UK there are currently 362 credit unions, offering an alternative to payday lenders to some 1.2 million members. Membership of London Capital Credit Union is restricted by common bond to individuals living or working in the City of London and London boroughs of Barnet, Camden, Hackney, Haringey and Islington, members of the South East Region of The Co-operative Group and the Greater London Region of Unite the Union or employees of a number of organisations, including Veolia Environmental Services and Circle Housing Group, nationally.

As part of Lloyds Banking Group's Helping Britain Prosper Plan, branches of Lloyds Bank and Halifax in the common bond area work with the credit union to ensure customers are signposted towards financial solutions that best meet their needs. This compliments a similar referral scheme run in conjunction with Barclays Bank.

In 2014, the credit union was awarded a grant of £100,000 by the Lloyds Banking Group Credit Union Development Fund to support its reserves and to help develop its work following merger with neighbouring credit unions.

Products
London Capital Credit Union runs a payroll deduction savings and loans scheme in conjunction with most major local employers. The credit union is responsible for the operation of the scheme, with the employer facilitating monthly deductions from salary. A payment card, accepted at Post Office and PayPoint outlets, can also be issued to members on request.

Low cost saver loans allocate part of the repayment to a share account, which means that as members repay loans their savings continue to grow. The credit union also offer a range of other products, including short-term and home-owner loans; credit builder loans, designed to help people repair their credit rating; and security loans, to encourage members not to withdraw their savings. CredEcardplus is a reloadable prepaid card that works in a similar way to a High Street bank account. The credit union has a 94% approval rate for its saver loans.

The credit union is an accredited London living wage employer. In 2015, the Fairbanking Foundation awarded London Capital Credit Union five stars for personal loan products in its first Mark certifications.

Dividends
Credit unions do not pay a fixed rate of interest on savings balances. Instead, they distribute any trading surplus to members in the form of an annual dividend calculated on average savings or as a rebate of loan interest paid. Recent dividends are shown below:

A member of the Association of British Credit Unions Limited, registered under the Industrial and Provident Societies Acts, London Capital Credit Union is authorised by the Prudential Regulation Authority and regulated by the Financial Conduct Authority and PRA. Ultimately, like the banks and building societies, members' savings are protected against business failure by the Financial Services Compensation Scheme.

See also
Credit unions in the United Kingdom
British co-operative movement

References

External links
London Capital Credit Union
Association of British Credit Unions

Credit unions of the United Kingdom
Banks established in 1997
Companies based in the London Borough of Islington
Unison (trade union)